Neo-Aristotelianism is a view of literature and rhetorical criticism propagated by the Chicago School — Ronald S. Crane, Elder Olson, Richard McKeon, Wayne Booth, and others — which means.

"A view of literature and criticism which takes a pluralistic attitude toward the history of literature and seeks to view literary works and critical theories intrinsically"

Neo-Aristotelianism was one of the first rhetorical methods of criticism. Its central features were first suggested in Herbert A. Wichelns' "The Literary Criticism of Oratory" in 1925. It focused on analyzing the methodology behind a speaker's ability to convey an idea to its audience. In 1943, Neo-Aristotelianism was further publicized, gaining popularity after William Norwood Brigance published A History and Criticism of American Public Address.

Unlike rhetorical criticism, which concentrates on the study of speeches and the immediate effect of rhetoric on an audience, Neo-Aristotelianism "led to the study of a single speaker because the sheer number of topics to cover relating to the rhetor and the speech made dealing with more than a single speaker virtually impossible. Thus, various speeches by different rhetors related by form of topic were not included in the scope of rhetorical criticism."

"The Literary Criticism of Oratory"
Wichelns' work was one of the first that introduced Neo-Aristotelianism. It narrowed down speech to 12 key topics to be studied, similar to many of the topics discussed by Aristotle in the Rhetoric. His topics for speech critique include:
 Speaker's personality 
 Character of the speaker (how the audience views a speaker) 
 Audience 
 Major ideas 
 Motives to which the speaker appealed 
 Nature of the speaker's proof (credibility) 
 Speaker's judgment of human nature in the audience 
 Arrangement 
 Mode of expression 
 Speech preparation 
 Delivery 
 Effect of the discourse on the immediate audience and long-term effects
According to Mark S. Klyn, author of "Toward a Pluralistic Rhetorical Criticism," "The Literary Criticism of Oratory" provided "substance and structure to a study which heretofore had been formless and ephemeral [...] it literally created the modern discipline of rhetorical criticism." Thus regardless of the lack of detail on these topics, it provided a modern structure of critiquing and analyzing speech via Neo-Aristotelianism, according to Donald C. Bryant.

See also
 New rhetorics

References

Literary theory
Rhetoric
Philosophical theories